KTM is an Austrian motorcycle and bicycle manufacturer.

KTM may also refer to:

Science and technology
 Kernel Transaction Manager, a kernel component in Microsoft's Windows Vista

International codes
 the city of Kathmandu
 the IATA code for Tribhuvan International Airport

Honours and awards
 Talent Medal of Korea is abbreviated to KTM as the post-nominal

Companies and organisations
 Keretapi Tanah Melayu, the national railway company in Malaysia